WQBT (94.1 FM), known as "94.1 The Beat", is a mainstream urban radio station licensed to Savannah, Georgia. It is owned by iHeartMedia, Inc.  Its studios are located in Garden City (with a Savannah address) and utilizes a transmitter located west of Savannah in unincorporated Chatham County.

Programming
The station had controversial morning hosts Star and Buc Wild—which replaced Russ Parr in the morning slot. Parr's show has since returned to WQBT's morning drive time slot, but as of 2016, it is now home to The Breakfast Club.

History

Before the mid-1970s, the station was a simulcast of WTOC (AM), and had the callsign of WTOC-FM. Before it was an Urban Contemporary formatted station, it had a long stint as a country music formatted station to compete with daytimer WEAS. In the late '80s and early '90s, the callsign WCHY was part of the station's identity as a country station ("WCHY 94.1 Continuous Country"; the station would sometimes refer to itself as "Y-94".), thus the callsign's creation, as at that time it stood for We're  Country Hits Y'all!

WCHY (AM) and WCHY-FM were sold by Roth Broadcasting in 1995 to WP Radio, which in turn was selling its stations to Patterson Broadcasting as WP Radio left the business.

Later, this station was WSCA-FM - "Cat Country 94."

See also
List of radio stations in Georgia (U.S. state)
Georgia (U.S. state)
Lists of radio stations in North and Central America

References

External links

African-American history in Savannah, Georgia
Mainstream urban radio stations in the United States
QBT
IHeartMedia radio stations